Epiherpia is a genus of solenogasters, shell-less, worm-like molluscs. 

It contains only one known species, Epiherpia vixinsignis, which was originally classified as a species of Epimenia, with doubt, based on a single immature specimen.

References

Solenogastres